Hope Elizabeth Hope-Clarke OBE (February 1870 – 19 July 1950) was a British charity campaigner, the founder and honorary organiser of the Silver Thimble Fund, "one of the most successful charities of the First World War".

Hope Elizabeth Hope-Clarke was born in February 1870, in Calcutta, British India.

A few years after the war ended, Hope-Clarke moved to the United States and settled in New Orleans, where she befriended Martha Gilmore Robinson, who set up the Silver Thimble Fund of America, which helped injured British and American soldiers in the Second World War. 

Hope-Clarke was awarded an OBE in the 1949 New Year Honours List.

Hope-Clarke died in London on 19 July 1950, at the age of 80.

References

1870 births
1950 deaths
Officers of the Order of the British Empire
British charity and campaign group workers
British women activists
People from Kolkata